The 1989–90 Sheffield Shield season was the 88th season of the Sheffield Shield, the domestic first-class cricket competition of Australia. New South Wales won the championship.

Table

Final

Statistics

Most Runs
Mark Waugh 967

Most Wickets
Craig McDermott 54

References

Sheffield Shield
Sheffield Shield
Sheffield Shield seasons